Mike Ogletree (born 1 May 1956) is a Scottish drummer and guitarist of Afro-European descent. A founding member of the Scottish rock band Café Jacques, he is best known for his work in the new wave bands Fiction Factory and Simple Minds. He now lives and works in the United States, as well as performing occasional shows there.

See also
 Fiction Factory
 Simple Minds

References

1956 births
Living people
20th-century Scottish musicians
21st-century Scottish musicians
British male drummers
Scottish male guitarists
Scottish expatriates in the United States
Scottish new wave musicians
Scottish rock drummers
Scottish rock guitarists
Simple Minds members
20th-century British male musicians
21st-century British male musicians
Black British rock musicians